A drive-through or drive-thru (a sensational spelling of the word through), is a type of take-out service provided by a business that allows customers to purchase products without leaving their cars. The format was pioneered in the United States in the 1930s, and has since spread to other countries. Hillcrest State Bank, Dallas, Texas, installed the first drive-through banking system in America. It was a George Dahl designed building, constructed in the 1920s, across from SMU. The second recorded use of a bank using a drive-up window teller was the Grand National Bank of St. Louis, Missouri in 1930. The drive-up teller allowed only deposits at that time.

Orders are generally placed using a microphone and picked up in person at the window. A drive-through is different from a drive-in in several ways - the cars create a line and move in one direction in drive-throughs, and normally do not park, whereas drive-ins allow cars to park next to each other, the food is generally brought to the window by a server, called a carhop, and the customer can remain in the parked car to eat. However, during peak periods, to keep the queue down and avoid traffic flow problems, drive-throughs occasionally switch to an "order at the window, then park in a designated space" model where the customer will receive their food from an attendant when it is ready to be served. This results in a perceived relationship between the two service models.

Drive-throughs have generally replaced drive-ins in popular culture, and are now found in the vast majority of modern American fast-food chains. Sometimes, a store with a drive-through is referred to as a "drive-through", or the term is attached to the service, such as, "drive-through restaurant". or "drive-through bank".

Drive-throughs typically have signs over the drive-through lanes to show customers which lanes are open for business. The types of signage used is usually illuminated so the "open" message can be changed to a "closed" message when the lane is not available.

Drive-through restaurants

A drive-through restaurant generally consists of:
 A speaker and microphone for customers to place their orders
 A speaker and microphone or wireless headset system for employees to hear the customer's order (when a speaker is used)
 A trigger pad beneath the concrete to activate the microphone and headset, possibly augmented with a CCTV camera
 One or more free-standing signs listing the menu items, called a menu board
 Newer drive-throughs feature a LCD or LED display within the speaker system in order to show the full order and total cost to avert order errors through miscommunication. At many brands of restaurants, a secondary display featuring the total is placed directly next to the order window. This is to ensure that the customer will know if the cashier intentionally overcharges them.
 Windows where employees interact with customers by processing the customer's payment and giving them their order. Most drive-throughs have either one window serving both functions, or two windows with the first being used for payment and the second used for retrieving the order.
 Most restaurants have marked parking spaces just beyond the last window. If there is a significant delay in an individual customer's order (e.g. a special order), an employee may direct that customer to park in this area, clearing the drive-through lane for the next customer and preventing knock-on delays to other customers. When the order is ready, an employee hand-delivers the order to the customer. This service therefore occasionally has some similarities to drive-in service, but only during peak periods.

Drive-through designs are different from restaurant to restaurant; however, most drive-throughs can accommodate four to six passenger cars or trucks at once (called the queue). Most drive-through lanes are designed so the service windows and speaker are on the driver's side of the car, for example, in left-hand traffic (right-hand drive) countries such as the UK, Ireland, Australia, India and New Zealand, the windows will be on the right side of the drive-through lane, and vice versa in right-hand traffic (left-hand drive) countries such as North America and mainland Europe. There are a few drive-through lanes designed with the service windows on the passenger side, but these lanes are disfavored as they cannot be used easily by cars with only a driver.

According to a 2021 report in QSR Magazine, 42 percent of all customer traffic came to the drive up window. The fastest drive-through of 2020 in the United States was Taco Bell, with an average time of 4.46 minutes, followed by KFC with 4.53 minutes, 4.76 minutes at Carl's Jr and 4.91 minutes at Dunkin'.

Coffee is sometimes sold at a drive-through coffee shops.

History
In 1921, Kirby's Pig Stand introduced the drive-in restaurant, in which carhops delivered meals.  In 1931, a California Pig Stand franchise introduced a drive-through service that bypassed the carhops. In 1948, Harry and Esther Snyder of the In-N-Out Burger chain built the first true drive-through restaurant, featuring a two-way speaker system that Harry Snyder invented himself earlier that year. By the 1970s, drive-through service had replaced drive-in restaurants in the United States.

The first McDonald's drive-through was created in 1975 in Sierra Vista, Arizona, near Fort Huachuca, a military installation, to serve military members who were not permitted to get out of their cars off-post while wearing fatigues. The original McDonald's was closed down and demolished in May 1999 and a new McDonald's replaced it.

In 1981, Max Hamburgers opened Northern Europe's first drive-in in Piteå.

Another early drive-through restaurant in Europe, a McDonald's drive-through, opened at the Nutgrove Shopping Centre in Dublin, Ireland in 1985.

In the US, drive-throughs account for 70 percent of McDonald's business and the average drive through order is fulfilled in under three and one half minutes. Outside of the US, McDonald's drive-throughs are variously known as "McAuto", "McDrive" and "AutoMac".

In 2010, the Casa Linda, Texas, franchise of McDonald's opened a drive-through/walk-up only store with no indoor seating although it has a small patio with tables.

In McDonald's in the UK, all McDonald's are going under an EOTF transformation (Experience of the Future), where many McDonald's with Drive-Thrus will have a third window. This would be where at the second window, the presenter would tell customers to pull up to the third window (if they've got a larger order and have longer to wait), this is known as the "fast forward window". This reduces waiting times for customers.

Drive-through banking

In 1928, City Center Bank, which became UMB Financial Corporation, president R. Crosby Kemper opened what is considered the first drive-up window.  Shortly after the Grand National Bank in St Louis opened up a drive-through, including a slot to the side for night time deposits. Westminster Bank opened the UK's first drive-through bank in Liverpool in 1959, soon followed by Ulster Bank opening Ireland's first in 1961 at Finaghy.

In recent years, there has been a decline in drive-through banking due to increased traffic congestion and the increased availability of automated teller machines and telephone and internet banking. However, many bank buildings now feature drive-through ATMs.

Drive-through stores

Grocery shopping
Harold Willis and his father, Robert Willis, first incorporated a dairy and eggs drive through service in Redlands, California, in the early 1940s, supplying milk and eggs quickly and efficiently to driving customers; this utilized a dairy conveyor belt that Harold Willis had invented. Some supermarkets offer drive-through facilities for grocery shopping. In the UK, this service was first announced by Tesco in August 2010. In the United States, Crafty's Drive-Buy Grocery Store in Virginia started offering the service. In 2012, the Dutch chain Albert Heijn introduced a "Pick Up Point" where one can collect groceries bought online.

Dairy products are available at a drive-through dairy store (notably the Skinner Dairy shops of North-East Florida or Dairy Barn in Long Island).

In the early 1990s, the French Jean Duchaine came up with the idea of using drive-thru for the retail market. 
The drive-thru was the Pillar of a full concept built with many innovative ideas: walk-thru, dark store, market place, big data, ads...

Liquor stores 
Alcoholic beverages have been sold at a drive-through liquor store (called a "Beer Through", a "Cruise Through", a "Brew Thru" in the U.S. eastern Mid-Atlantic coast, or a "Pony Keg" in certain areas; generally illegal in the Northeast and West)

Drive-through medical testing
During the COVID-19 pandemic, drive-through testing became a common approach around the world for testing people who were potentially infected with the virus. In 2020, drive-through testing facilities were set up in many countries to test whether passengers were infected with COVID-19 (the first being in South Korea).

This approached allowed medical workers to process high volumes of tests quickly while reducing exposure and risk of infection between those being tested by keeping patients isolated in their vehicles.

The process typically saw patients present their ID before being swabbed while remaining in their vehicles, before driving off once the test was complete. Their results were then typically shared with them either via text message or via their doctor.

Emissions and traffic

Emissions
In recent years, drive-through restaurants and other drive-through facilities have faced increased scrutiny due to the higher levels of emissions that they create – compared to walk-in equivalents.
A 2018 study by QSR Magazine found that the average waiting time at a McDonald's drive-through restaurant in the US took 3 minutes and 15 seconds, with an average of 3.8 cars waiting at any one time. This figure rose to an average of 4 minutes 25 seconds in 2019.

If the average motorist avoided idling for just 3 minutes every day of the year,  emissions would be reduced by 1.4 million tonnes annually, or the equivalent of taking 320,000 cars off the road.

In response to emerging evidence of the role that drive-throughs play in contributing to climate change, Minneapolis banned the construction of new drive-throughs in 2019, while a number of other US cities including Creve, Coeur, Fair Haven and Orchard Park have enacted ordinances to restrict or prohibit fast-food drive-through restaurants.

Outside the US, a total of 27 municipalities have banned drive-through restaurants on the grounds of environmental and health concerns from engine idling

Traffic
Long drive-through lines in the United States have been reported to cause traffic backups, blocking emergency vehicles and city buses and increasing the risk of collisions and pedestrian injuries. The popularity of Chick-fil-A's drive-throughs in particular has led to traffic problems, police interventions, and complaints by neighboring businesses in more than 20 states.

Other examples
Some other examples of drive-through businesses include:
 Postal services at a drive-through mailbox
 Prescriptions at a drive-through pharmacy
 Marriage (primarily at special drive-through marriage chapels in Las Vegas in the United States)
 Funeral home where mourners can drive by, view and make offerings to the remains of their loved ones through windows.
 Pennsylvania State Representative Kevin P. Murphy installed a drive-through window designed to speed constituent service.
 Photo processing at Fotomat.

Non-car usage

Pedestrian
Pedestrians sometimes attempt to walk through the drive-through to order food after the seated section of a fast-food restaurant has closed. Many establishments refuse drive-through service to pedestrians for safety, insurance, and liability reasons.  Cyclists are usually refused service with the same justification given.
However, in the summer of 2009, Burgerville gave use of the drive-through window to bicyclists. Similar issues can arise in rural areas for people on horseback or in a horse-drawn carriage.

On 20 July 2013, a woman was fined for taking her horse inside a McDonald's restaurant in Greater Manchester, United Kingdom after being refused service at the drive-through. The horse ended up defecating inside the restaurant which caused distress to other customers.

In May 2016, Scott McGee filed a United States federal class action lawsuit pursuing action against McDonald's due to the company being unwilling to serve people who are visually impaired when only the drive thru lane is open.  , the matter was still in litigation.

On May 24, 2018, a law came into effect in Portland Oregon requiring multi-modal access to drive-throughs.  The new zoning law states, "When a drive-through facility is open and other pedestrian-oriented customer entrances to the business are unavailable or locked, the drive-through facility must serve customers using modes other than a vehicle such as pedestrians and bicyclists."

Walk-up windows

Some establishments provide a walk-up window instead when a drive-through may not be practical. However, the walk-up windows should not be confused with small establishments that customers are lined up for services such as mobile kitchens, kiosks or concession stands. These walk-up windows are value-added services on top of the full services provided inside the stores.

The walk-up windows generally provide similar customer experience with the drive-throughs by allowing customers to receive services from the exterior of the facilities through a window. There are many reasons for the owners to provide such services. An example is when McDonald's entered a new market in Russia where the majority of families did not own cars, the owners developed the walk-up windows as an alternative. Another reason is to have a drive-through experience in the locations that are not feasible to construct a drive-through lane such as in city centers. Some establishments may want to use walk-up windows to attract certain customer demographics such as younger customers who need quick service during late night. Another reason is to offer extended service hours and maintain a safe environment for employees, such as a bulletproof walk-up window in high-crime areas.

Ski-through
McDonald's first opened a ski-through called McSki in the ski resort of Lindvallen, Sweden in 1996.

See also
 B-Bop's
 Drive-in
 Disposable food packaging
 Effects of the car on societies

References

External links

Restaurants by type
Road transport